History of Nishapur is an encyclopedia written in Arabic by Hakim Nishapuri (933 - 1014 CE) for an introduction of the city and the quarter of Nishapur in Khorasan. It also introduces its reader to the scientists and the people of importance in Nishapur of the Middle Ages. Only a small part of it remains and its original version is lost. This book has been translated to Persian by Mohammad Ibn Hossein Khalife Nishapuri.

References 

Geography books
History books about Iran
Encyclopedias
History of Nishapur
Khorasan
Nishapur